The Dressmaker of Luneville is a 1932 French comedy film directed by Harry Lachman and starring Madeleine Renaud, Pierre Blanchar and Jeanne Fusier-Gir. It was made at the Joinville Studios by the French subsidiary of Paramount Pictures. Fox later bought the rights to the film and remade it as Dressed to Thrill in 1935.

Cast
 Madeleine Renaud as Anna Tripied / Irene Salvago  
 Pierre Blanchar as Claude Roland  
 Jeanne Fusier-Gir as Léonie  
 Armand Lurville as Silbur  
 Monique Rolland 
 R. Dock 
 Billy Milton 
 Jean Gobet 
 Pierre Labry

References

Bibliography 
 Segrave, Kerry. Foreign Films in America: A History. McFarland, 2004.

External links 
 

1932 films
French comedy films
1932 comedy films
1930s French-language films
Films directed by Harry Lachman
French black-and-white films
French films based on plays
1930s French films